Calderonella is a genus of Colombian and Panamanian plants in the grass family. The only known species is Calderonella sylvatica.

See also
 List of Poaceae genera

References

External links 
 Grassbase - The World Online Grass Flora: Calderonella

Panicoideae
Flora of Panama
Flora of Colombia
Grasses of North America
Monotypic Poaceae genera

nl:Calderonella